Each year, the jury of the Cannes Film Festival is chaired by an internationally recognized personality of cinema. Being appointed to this position is the recognition of an outstanding career.

Since 1960, there has been only one personality to get this honor twice: Jeanne Moreau in 1975 and 1995. The last non-professional film personality to be president of the jury is the American writer William Styron in 1983.

Since 1987, the Official Selection includes a separate jury and its President in the frame of the Caméra d'Or ("Golden Camera") which chooses its best feature film presented in one of the Cannes' selections (Official Selection, Directors' Fortnight, or International Critics' Week). Since 1998, another separate jury and its President have been added for the films of the Un Certain Regard section.

Main competition jury presidents

Caméra d'Or jury presidents
The Caméra d'Or ("Golden Camera") is an award of the Cannes Film Festival for the best first feature film presented in one of the Cannes' selections (Official Selection, Directors' Fortnight or International Critics' Week).

Un Certain Regard jury presidents 
Un Certain Regard is a section of the Cannes Film Festival's official selection. This section presents 20 "original and different" works which seek international recognition.

See also
 List of Berlin International Film Festival jury presidents
 List of Venice Film Festival jury presidents

Notes

References 

Cannes Film Festival